Lave was an ironclad floating battery of the French Navy during the 19th century.

Lave may also refer to:

People 
 Jean Lave, American anthropologist 
 Kitione Lave, Tongan boxer
 Lave Cross (1866–1927), American third baseman in Major League Baseball
 Lave Winham (1881–1951), American pitcher in Major League Baseball

Other 
Lave net, used to catch salmon in river estuaries